Coleophora quadristraminella is a moth of the family Coleophoridae. It is found in France, Italy, Croatia, North Macedonia and Greece.

The larvae feed on the leaves of Achillea millefolium.

References

quadristraminella
Moths of Europe
Moths described in 1961